Eric Elmore Dimsey (22 September 1892 – 17 October 1970) was an Australian rules footballer who played with Melbourne in the Victorian Football League (VFL).

Notes

External links 

1892 births
Australian rules footballers from Victoria (Australia)
Melbourne Football Club players
1970 deaths